Harvest Home may refer to:
 Harvest Home (Hilda Vaughan novel), a 1936 novel by Hilda Vaughan
 Harvest Home (novel), a 1973 horror novel by Tom Tryon
 An abbreviated name for the 1978 television mini-series adapted from the novel, more properly :The  Dark Secret of Harvest Home
 Harvest Home (1995 film), a 1995 film
 Harvest Home (2009 film), a 2009 film by Craig Whitney
 "Harvest Home" (song), a 1982 song by Big Country
 Mabon (Wicca) or Harvest Home, a holiday in the Wiccan Wheel of the Year
 Harvest Home, a shipwreck off the coast of Newfoundland
 Crop Over, a harvest festival originating in Barbados
 Harvest Home, Irish folk tune

See also
 "Come Ye Thankful People, Come", a hymn